This is a list of episodes of the American animated television series, Ben 10: Alien Force. The series was created for Cartoon Network by team Man of Action (a group consisting of Duncan Rouleau, Joe Casey, Joe Kelly, and Steven T. Seagle), and produced by Cartoon Network Studios. It takes place five years after the original Ben 10 series and takes a darker turn than its predecessor. Ben 10: Alien Force was followed by the direct 2010 sequel series Ben 10: Ultimate Alien.

Series overview

Episodes

Season 1 (2008)
10 Aliens - Swampfire, Echo Echo, Humungousaur, Jetray, Big Chill, Chromastone, Brainstorm, Spidermonkey, Goop, Alien X.
Ben returns after a gap of 5 years only to find that the world is suffering an Alien Invasion by a powerful alien race called Highbreeds  DNAliens, his Omnitrix has recallibrated, giving him more powerful aliens, and Grandpa Max has gone missing. He teams up with Gwen who has mastered her magic, and Kevin Levin who has changed sides with Ben.
Through some intentionally left-behind hologram messages, Max assigns Ben, Gwen and Kevin, the task of finding fellow Plumber Kids such as, Alan, Michael Morningstar, Manny, Helen, Pierce and  Cooper along with Julie and Ship as well as Professor Paradox and Azmuth.

Season 2 (2008–09)
13 Aliens - Swampfire, Chromastone, Murk Upchuck,  Spidermonkey, Echo Echo, Way Big, Humungousaur, Alien X, Goop, Jetray, Big Chill, Cannonbolt, Brainstorm.
Ben, Gwen and Kevin along with fellow plumbers, finally defeat Highbreeds.
Grandpa Max arrives back in the season finale, and Ben gets access to some old and new aliens.

Season 3 (2009–10)
17 Aliens - Swampfire, Chromastone, Goop, Big Chill, Jetray, Humungousaur, Alien X, Brainstorm, Echo Echo, Spidermonkey, Rath, Lodestar, Way Big, Cannonbolt, Murk Upchuck, Ghostfreak, Diamondhead.
Ben's arch nemesis and biggest enemy Vilgax returns being 10 times powerful from before.
While unlocking the Master Control of Omnitrix, Kevin becomes a mutation of different alloys. (he was later healed in the season finale)
It is revealed that Kevin's father Devin Levin was a plumber and a friend of Max Tennyson.
The Omnitrix is destroyed in the series finale, and Ben replaces it with the more powerful Ultimatrix.

Live-action film (2009)

Video short (2009)

DVD releases

See also
 List of Ben 10 episodes
 List of Ben 10: Ultimate Alien episodes
 List of Ben 10: Omniverse episodes
 List of Ben 10 (2016 TV series) episodes

Notes

References

Lists of American children's animated television series episodes
Lists of Cartoon Network television series episodes
2000s television-related lists
2010s television-related lists
Alien Force